Rwampara District is a district in South Western Uganda. The district was carved out from Mbarara District and given the district status in July 2019.

Location
The District Borders Sheema District in the North, Isingiro and Mbarara District in the East, Isingiro District in the South and Ntungamo District in the West.

Overview
Rwampara District was granted District status in 2019. The district got its name from the county name Rwampara that was upgraded to the district status. The district has its headquarters in Kinoni Town.

Sub Counties
The District contains the following Sub counties Mwizi, Bugamba, Ndeija, Rugando, Nyeihanga Buteraniro Town Council and Katura Town Council.

See also
 Mbarara District

References

Districts of Uganda